Eerikulaid is an islet belonging to the country of Estonia.

See also
 List of islands of Estonia

  

Islands of Estonia
Hiiumaa Parish